The Pickle Barrel House is a two-story cabin built to resemble two barrels. It is currently located in Grand Marais on Michigan's Upper Peninsula near the southern shore of Lake Superior. It is near the intersection of State Highway M-77 and County Highway H-58 in this gateway town to the Pictured Rocks National Lakeshore. The main part is a  barrel and has two stories. The main floor is for the living area, and the upstairs is a bedroom. A smaller barrel serves as the kitchen, and the two barrels are connected by a pantry. There is an outdoor garden and also a seating area with a garden path between these two.

History

Early
William Donahey was an author, illustrator, and cartoonist. He created the Teenie Weenies cartoon feature, which was a widely syndicated comic that debuted in the Chicago Tribune in 1914. The comic feature continued until his death in 1970. It featured tiny people who lived in a world of life-sized objects. To these tiny people the real world objects were gargantuan.

Donahey did several advertisements for Reid-Murdock & Company for the Monarch Foods line. 
Teenie Weenies were on many of the labels of Monarch food products including coffee, peanut butter, popcorn, sausage, bacon, and all kinds of vegetables, including pickles. One advertisement featured a small pickle keg that was used as a house by some of his Teenie Weenies children characters.

One day in 1926 as a surprise for his wife Mary Dickerson Donahey, herself an author, Donahue, along with Reid-Murdock, had a duplicate large version of the keg house built that they could actually use. Reid-Murdock ordered the Pickle Barrel House to be built by the Pioneer Cooperage Company of Chicago. This special cottage would then be for the Donaheys to use as a summer cabin in the woods at Grand Sable Lake to inspire their writings. The barrel house was a large-scale version of the miniature oak casks that held the Monarch-brand pickles. The Donaheys received much attention for their "barrel house on the lake" since nobody had ever seen anything like this before. However, after 10 years it became a burden because of all the curiosity seekers and onlookers wanting to see how they lived. Ultimately they moved it from its original lake location.

Later

The Pickle Barrel house was moved to downtown Grand Marais in 1936 from the woods at nearby Grand Sable Lake when new tenants took possession.  Through the years it was an ice-cream stand, an information kiosk booth, and a souvenir gift shop. These various tenants over the many years did not maintain the cottage as it should have been, and the barrel house fell into disrepair. In 2003 the Grand Marais Historical Society acquired the property. They undertook the project of restoring the structure to its original condition. On July 3, 2005, after much work and with a budget of $125,000 (equivalent to $ in ) in expenses the renovated Pickle Barrel House was opened to the public. The barrel house now shows how the Donaheys lived there in their summer cottage in the woods by the lake in the 1920s and 1930s.

The barrel house museum has old pictures of the Donaheys in their one-of-a-kind pickle barrel cottage. Some of these old photos of the 1920s even show the "curiosity visitors" at their cottage in the woods. In the museum also are several books and other materials on William Donahey and his children's Teenie Weenies. One room alone showcases William Donahey and his artwork of creations of the Teenie Weenies. In this room is a  barrel on display showing a promotion for Monarch sweet pickles. The barrel house pretty much recreates its appearance and atmosphere when the Donaheys lived there. Tourists who visit the unique  house can now get the feel for what everyday life in a barrel would be like.

Historical marker

There is a Michigan Historical Marker at the Pickle Barrel House location. The barrel home has been accepted on the Michigan Register of Historic Places and is a Michigan Historic Home.

Gallery

References

External links 
Grand Marais Historical Society - operates the Pickle Barrel House
Historical photographs of the Pickle Barrel House
Pickle Barrel House museum dedication July 3, 2005
Other historical photographs of the Pickle Barrel House
Other history of Tweenie Weenies and Pickle Barrel House

Houses completed in 1926
Houses in Alger County, Michigan
Houses on the National Register of Historic Places in Michigan
Novelty buildings in Michigan
Museums in Alger County, Michigan
Mass media museums in the United States
Roadside attractions in Michigan
National Register of Historic Places in Alger County, Michigan
1926 establishments in Michigan